Thiru P. G. Narayanan an Indian politician from All India Anna Dravida Munnetra Kazhagam party is an incumbent member of the Tamil Nadu Legislative Assembly from the Bhavani constituency. He is a former Member of the Parliament of India representing Tamil Nadu in the Rajya Sabha, the upper house of the Indian Parliament.

He was elected to the Tamil Nadu legislative assembly as an Anna Dravida Munnetra Kazhagam candidate from Bhavani constituency in 1980, and 1984 elections.

References

External links
 Profile on Rajya Sabha website

Rajya Sabha members from Tamil Nadu
All India Anna Dravida Munnetra Kazhagam politicians
Living people
Lok Sabha members from Tamil Nadu
India MPs 1989–1991
India MPs 1991–1996
People from Tiruppur district
Year of birth missing (living people)
Tamil Nadu MLAs 1980–1984
Tamil Nadu MLAs 1985–1989
Tamil Nadu MLAs 2011–2016